Cancer Australia is the lead cancer control agency to the Government of Australia. The organisation was founded to raise cancer awareness to support those affected by cancer within Australia and its territories. The main focus of the organisation is to advise the Government on cancer control, develop policies, and to assist those living with cancer. In order to accomplish this, Cancer Australia works with many government and non-government organisations.

Cancer Australia collaborates with a wide range of groups, including those affected by cancer, service providers with an interest in cancer control, as well as stakeholders. The agency also focuses on populations who experience poorer health outcomes, including Indigenous Australians living in remote areas within Australia. In August 2015 Cancer Australia, along with the Australian Government, launched the first national Children's Cancer website.

Government organisations 

Cancer Australia works in collaboration with the following federal government organisations:

 Department of Health
 Australian Institute of Health and Welfare
 National Health and Medical Research Council

In addition to these, Cancer Australia also works in collaboration on a state level with the following organisations:

 Australian Capital Territory Department of Health
 Cancer Institute of New South Wales
 Queensland Health
 Department of Health and Human Services
 Victorian Cancer Agency
 Department of Health (Western Australia), Cancer and Palliative Care Network

Non-government organisations 

Cancer Australia also collaborates with the following non-government organisations:

 Cancer Council Australia
 Breast Cancer Network Australia
 Cancer Voices Australia
 CanTeen
 Leukaemia Foundation
 Lung Foundation Australia
 Myeloma Foundation Australia
National Breast Cancer Foundation
 Ovarian Cancer Australia
 Prostate Cancer Foundation of Australia

See also 

 Cancer
 List of Australian government entities

References

External links
 ACT Health website

Cancer organisations based in Australia